Operation Shikarpur(), is an ongoing operation against local docits of Sindh.

Overview
In the Kacha area of Shikarpur District, Sindh, police have warned people to evacuate temporarily from mosques so that there is no impediment to action against robbers and criminals. It may be recalled that an operation is being carried out against dacoits in Sukkur, Shikarpur and Kashmore districts of North Sindh. Two policemen and a police assistant were killed in an operation against the robbers last Sunday when the robbers targeted their armored vehicle with heavy weapons. On Monday, police arrested Tegho Khan Teghani, a chief of the Teghani tribe, from Karachi, after which the court remanded him to police. According to SSP Shikarpur Tanveer Tanio People move to safer places anyway after the floods hit Kacha and they have to do it anyway in the coming days, so the police have asked the people to help in the operation. "We have told the people in and around Garhi Tigho to evacuate. If anyone stays there and has a weapon and fires at the police, he will be found guilty." He will be considered either accomplice of the culprit or will be partner. The operation in Kacha was decided after an attack on a police party in Shikarpur's Kacha and the death of three people, including two policemen. Earlier, SSP Shikarpur Amir Masood Magsi and DIG Larkana Nasir Aftab were transferred.SSP Shikarpur said that two types of crimes are most prevalent in the district, one in which people are abducted from national highways or roads and taken to Kacha and the other in Kacha to steal cattle. "We have arrested two carriers who have been instrumental in abducting people from the area. With their help, we are tracking down the gangs involved in the kidnapping for ransom."Outposts have been set up in Garhi Tegho and Chak areas where incidents are common, while base camps are being set up. "There are also camps in the backup of this base camp so that we don't have to come from afar and take action. These camps will respond quickly and reach for immediate help."Weapons and safety improvements During the operation in Shikarpur last week, the robbers' bullets and rockets also tore apart the armored police vehicles. Now SSP Shikarpur Tanveer Tanio says he currently has state-of-the-art armored vehicles that will not be affected by anti-aircraft guns and heavy weapons such as rockets. Police are also using drone cameras to monitor the movement of the robbers and they also have snipers at the moment, but in the first phase, base camps will be set up to gain access to the mud. There will be progress after that. Along with Shikarpur, Sukkur also seems to be a rough area. According to SSP Sukkur Irfan Sammo that police had set up more than 25 outposts in Kacha and had gained access near the Indus River to prevent the accused from fleeing from Shikarpur. Supply should be stopped. He said that in addition to the locals in the Panu Aqil Kacha, strict measures have been taken to ensure that the supply is suspended and no one else can leave. In addition, white-clad accomplices of the robbers are being monitored in the paved areas.  Kashmore district of Sindh is a border area of Punjab and in the past, dacoits from Punjab have been taking refuge in Punjab by conducting operations in Sindh and Sindh. According to SSP Kashmore Amjad Sheikh the operation was already underway in Kashmore from Shikarpur in which the hideouts of the dacoits were set on fire and the police were advancing on a daily basis. There is also an exchange of fire on the ground. He said that there are obstacles in the way of forests and bushes along the way which are being removed while the Kacha area adjacent to Shikarpur Kacha is also being monitored.

Kacha Region
The Forest Department has millions of acres of land in the Kacha area on both sides of the Indus River, of which a large area is occupied, according to the department. Many large landowners have thousands of acres of raw land called Katie in the local language. Many of these big landowners are also active in politics. The Kacha area remains dry for most of the year but is flooded during the flood season. The land here is considered to be the most fertile due to the presence of river minerals. The Sindh Disaster Management Department estimates that there are more than one million people living here, who are involved in livestock farming and agriculture. On one side of the river is Kashmore district and on the other side is Ghotki district. The Kacha area of the Indus River is also in many districts of central and southern Sindh, but Kashmore, Ghotki, Shikapur and Jacobabad are the districts where dacoits are active and tribal conflicts are also intense in these districts. Forests, bushes and rough terrain make it easier for robbers to carry out their operations in secret and seek refuge here. Sukkur journalist and analyst Jan Mohammad Mehr says that the Sukkur region includes eight districts of northern Sindh and the law and order situation here was very bad and more than 150 people have been abducted in the last one and a half years. ۔ According to Jan Mohammad Mehr, when the dacoits made and shared social media videos, challenged the police and killed policemen in Shikarpur, then there was severe criticism on which the Prime Minister also took notice and Federal Interior Minister Sheikh Rashid Karachi. Arrived, where he met with DG Rangers. Besides, Chief Minister Murad Ali Shah came to Shikarpur and thus it was decided to intensify the operation.

South Punjab Operation
Addicted to blood, a kidnapped man is lying on the ground and screaming in pain while some people are holding him by the arms and legs. As soon as they see him, one of the kidnappers stabs him with a sharp instrument. The abductee's arms and nose were cut off, after which the abductee died in agony. These scenes are not from a scary movie but from a video that went viral on social media recently, uploaded by the notorious 'Lady Gang' of Dera Ghazi Khan, the hometown of Punjab Chief Minister Usman Bazdar.
The shocking video shows the kidnappers, who were later identified as Ramzan, being brutally murdered by their captors because they suspected that The man is a police informant and was providing information about the gang to the police. According to the local police, a clash broke out when the Lady gang members came to arrest three members of the Dohri tribe on suspicion of being informers. The three were Ramzan, Khairo and Khadim. Khairo was killed during the clash, while the other two were abducted and taken to their hideout by gang members, where a video of the brutal killing of Ramzan has now surfaced, with Khadim still missing. According to police, the lady gang has been involved in serious incidents like murder, robbery, extortion, kidnapping and theft for more than a decade. Police say several leaders and members of the gang have been killed in police encounters over the past few years, but 25 to 30 of their operatives are still a headache for locals, police and law enforcement in the area. Are made. Why are the police in the hilly and tribal areas of Dera Ghazi Khan and Rajanpur always having difficulty in controlling a handful of small gang or lady gang members? To answer this question, we must first understand these tribal areas and their policing system. When and how the Lady Gang came into being, let's look at what the current policing system is in the area and how it works.

Dera Ghazi Khan and Rajanpur Tribal Areas and Border Military Police
During the British rule, the Punjab Border Military Police Act 1904 was introduced to monitor law and order in the tribal and mountainous areas of Rajanpur and Dera Ghazi Khan, under which the Border Military Police and the Baloch Levy were introduced. The Baloch levy is almost gone, while more than 100 years later, the Border Military Police is still in place. The same force is operating in these specific hill and tribal areas in Dera Ghazi Khan and Rajanpur, while there is no Punjab police or district police intervention. According to the Punjab Border Military Police Act, 1904, the Deputy Commissioner is the Senior Commandant of the Border Military Police, while the Grade 17 Civil Administration Officer is its Commandant. There are positions such as police inspector rank (equivalent) and cavalry (soldier) etc.

Ladi gang or Chakrani gang
Talking about Ladi Gang, Sardar Mohsin Ata Khan Khosa said that Ladi Gang is probably completely extinct and its name is used while the present gang is actually Chakrani Gang whose patron is Musa Chakrani. Police have killed almost all the members of the Ladi gang, including its ringleader Muhammad Bakhsh, and the one or two children are now members of the Chakrani gang. But since the name of Ladi Gang has become famous, Chakrani Gang is also being taken as Ladi Gang.
The gang is now run by 30- to 35-year-old Musa and 22-23-year-old Khodi Chakrani, a sub-caste of the Khosa tribe. According to Sardar Mohsin Ata Khan Khosa, Musa Chakrani had committed a murder in his tribe at an early age for which he was sentenced to death and the Supreme Court upheld the sentence but as a result of reconciliation among the people of the tribe, then Musa was released.
After his release, Musa told the management of DG Khan Cement Factory that he could protect them from the extortionists of Lady Gang but in return he and his people wanted compensation, but the factory management turned down the offer which He then started looting in the area. Due to lack of resources, the police put the local Jundani Khosa tribe on the front line for their help, but the gang killed eight to nine members of the tribe, after which the Jundani tribe migrated from there.

Reference

Sindh
2021 in Pakistan
Sindh police
Police operations in Pakistan